The 2011 general election in Yukon, Canada, took place on October 11, 2011, to return members to the 33rd Yukon Legislative Assembly.

The incumbent government was led by Darrell Pasloski, who was elected as leader of the Yukon Party at a convention on May 28, 2011, replacing former Premier Dennis Fentie. The Yukon Party won its third majority government, with Elizabeth Hanson's NDP becoming the Official Opposition, replacing the Liberal Party, whose leader Arthur Mitchell was unable to return to the Assembly.

Pre-writ period

Redistribution
In 2008, the Yukon Assembly struck a committee to review the electoral district boundaries for this election. The committee decided to increase the number of seats in the territory to 19. Yukon now matches the other territorial assemblies in the Northwest Territories and Nunavut in terms of the number of seats.

The rural districts outside of the capital city of Whitehorse remained unchanged with the exception of Mount Lorne and Southern Lakes which were merged into a single district. The total number of rural districts dropped from 9 to 8.

The urban ridings in Whitehorse were increased to 11 from 9. Only three districts in Whitehorse had no boundary changes, Whitehorse Centre, Riverdale North and Riverdale South. The riding that received the most significant alteration was Copperbelt. That district was split into four ridings, primarily Copperbelt North and Copperbelt South, while McIntyre-Takhini was significantly expanded in western uninhabited part of Copperbelt and renamed Takhini-Kopper King. An entirely new riding was also created out of Copperbelt called Mountainview. The remaining urban districts all received minor boundary adjustments.

The boundary changes were adopted by the Yukon Legislative Assembly in 2009.

Lake Laberge dispute
In the fall of 2009, Yukon Party MLA Brad Cathers had a falling out with Premier Dennis Fentie, and ended up sitting as an independent on the opposition side.

Cathers remained a party member despite his public criticism of Fentie. On May 19, 2010, the Yukon Party riding executive of Lake Laberge nominated Brad Cathers as a delegate to the party's 2010 convention. The meeting lasted three hours and saw the riding executive loyal to Fentie, including the President, walk out on the 60 members who attended. Former MLA Al Falle defended Cathers at the meeting. The meeting ended with a board of directors loyal to Cathers being elected.

Summary of results
Official results.

Candidates running
Bold incumbents indicates cabinet members and party leaders and the speaker of the assembly are italicized.

Rural Yukon

|-
|bgcolor=whitesmoke|Klondike
| ||Steve Nordick404 (37.4%)
| ||Jorn Meier147 (13.6%)
|| ||Sandy Silver530 (49.0%)
| ||
|| ||Steve Nordick
|-
|bgcolor=whitesmoke|Kluane
|| ||Wade Istchenko287 (37.9%)
| ||Eric Stinson220 (29.0%)
| ||Timothy Cant219 (28.9%)
| ||Gerald Dickson (FNP)32 (4.2%)
|| ||Gary McRobb†
|-
|bgcolor=whitesmoke|Lake Laberge
|| ||Brad Cathers528 (51.9%)
| ||Frank Turner330 (32.4%)
| ||Mike Simon159 (15.6%)
| ||
|| ||Brad Cathers
|-
|bgcolor=whitesmoke|Mayo-Tatchun
| ||Elaine Wyatt214 (31.6%)
|| ||Jim Tredger282 (41.7%)
| ||Eric Fairclough181 (26.7%)
| ||
|| ||Eric Fairclough
|-
|rowspan=3 bgcolor=whitesmoke|Mount Lorne-Southern Lakes
|rowspan=3|
|rowspan=3|Deborah Fulmer395 (37.9%)
|rowspan=3 |
|rowspan=3|Kevin Barr488 (46.8%)
|rowspan=3|
|rowspan=3|Ted Adel111 (10.6%)
|rowspan=3|
|rowspan=3|Stanley James (FNP)49 (4.7%)
||
|VacantMount Lorne
|-
|colspan=2|Merged district
|-
||
|Patrick Rouble†Southern Lakes
|-
|bgcolor=whitesmoke|Pelly-Nisutlin
|| ||Stacey Hassard275 (49.4%)
| ||Carol Geddes178 (32.0%)
| ||Carl Sidney73 (13.1%)
| ||Elvis Presley (Ind.)31 (5.6%)
|| ||Marian Horne
|-
|bgcolor=whitesmoke|Vuntut Gwitchin
| ||Garry Njootli52 (35.9%)
| ||
|| ||Darius Elias93 (64.1%)
| ||
|| ||Darius Elias
|-
|bgcolor=whitesmoke|Watson Lake
|| ||Patti McLeod276 (37.8%)
| ||Liard McMillan242 (33.1%)
| ||Thomas Slager165 (22.6%)
| ||Patricia Gilhooly (Ind.)48 (6.6%)
|| ||Dennis Fentie†
|}

Whitehorse

|-
|bgcolor=whitesmoke rowspan=2|Copperbelt North
|rowspan=2 | 
|rowspan=2|Currie Dixon520 (47.9%)
|rowspan=2|
|rowspan=2|Skeeter Miller-Wright159 (14.6%)
|rowspan=2|
|rowspan=2|Arthur Mitchell407 (37.5%)
|rowspan=2|
|rowspan=2|
|colspan=2|Split district
|-
|rowspan=2 |
|rowspan=2|Arthur MitchellCopperbelt
|-
|rowspan=2 bgcolor=whitesmoke|Copperbelt South
|rowspan=2|
|rowspan=2|Valerie Boxall394 (40.4%)
|rowspan=2 | 
|rowspan=2|Lois Moorcroft397 (40.7%)
|rowspan=2|
|rowspan=2|Colleen Wirth184 (18.9%)
|rowspan=2|
|rowspan=2|
|-
|colspan=2|Split district
|-
|bgcolor=whitesmoke|Mountainview
|| ||Darrell Pasloski480 (44.8%)
| ||Stephen Dunbar-Edge376 (35.1%)
| ||Dave Sloan216 (20.1%)
| ||
|colspan=2|New district
|-
|bgcolor=whitesmoke|Porter Creek Centre
|| ||David Laxton298 (38.6%)
| ||Jean-François Des Lauriers230 (29.8%)
| ||Kerry Huff245 (31.7%)
| ||
|| ||Archie Lang†
|-
|bgcolor=whitesmoke|Porter Creek North
|| ||Doug Graham400 (49.8%)
| ||Mike Tribes253 (31.5%)
| ||Dawn Beauchemin82 (10.2%)
| ||Mike Ivens (Green)69 (8.6%)
||
|Jim Kenyon†
|-
|bgcolor=whitesmoke|Porter Creek South
|| ||Mike Nixon257 (42.9%)
| ||John Carney99 (16.5%)
| ||Don Inverarity243 (40.6%)
| ||
||
|Don Inverarity
|-
|bgcolor=whitesmoke|Riverdale North
|| ||Scott Kent366 (37.1%)
| ||Peter Lesniak296 (30.0%)
| ||Christie Richardson289 (29.3%)
| ||Kristina Calhoun (Green)35 (3.5%)
||
|Ted Staffen†
|-
|bgcolor=whitesmoke|Riverdale South
| ||Glenn Hart314 (32.4%)
|| ||Jan Stick380 (39.3%)
| ||Dan Curtis274 (28.3%)
| ||
||
|Glenn Hart
|-
|bgcolor=whitesmoke|Takhini-Kopper King
| ||Samson Hartland316 (31.7%)
|| ||Kate White458 (45.9%)
| ||Cherish Clarke224 (22.4%)
| ||
||
|John Edzerza†McIntyre-Takhini
|-
|bgcolor=whitesmoke|Whitehorse Centre
| ||Marian Horne202 (24.3%)
|| ||Elizabeth (Liz) Hanson525 (63.2%)
| ||Patrick Singh104 (12.5%)
| ||
||
|Elizabeth (Liz) Hanson
|-
|bgcolor=whitesmoke|Whitehorse West
|| ||Elaine Taylor422 (58.2%)
| ||Louis R. Gagnon94 (13.0%)
| ||Cully Robinson209 (28.8%)
| ||
||
|Elaine Taylor
|}

Timeline
October 10, 2006, the Yukon Party, under Dennis Fentie, wins its second majority government in the 36th Yukon general election.
January 2009, John Edzerza resigns from the YNDP to sit again as an independent.
August 28, 2009, Brad Cathers, MLA for Lake Laberge resigns from cabinet and the government caucus to sit as an independent member over issues with Premier Dennis Fentie.
September 26, 2009, the NDP chooses Elizabeth Hanson as party leader.
October 22, 2009, John Edzerza joins the Yukon Party (which he had previously been a member of until 2006) and now serves as Minister of the Environment.
July 28, 2010, Todd Hardy, MLA for Whitehorse Centre and former leader of the Yukon New Democratic Party dies after a long battle with leukemia at age 53.
September 17, 2010, the United Citizens Party of Yukon is registered.
December 13, 2010, in a by-election, Elizabeth Hanson is elected MLA of Whitehorse Centre with 51% of the vote.
February 28, 2011, the Yukon Green Party is registered.
April/May 2011, United Citizens Party leader Willard Phelps resigns.
May 28, 2011, the Yukon Party chooses Darrell Pasloski as party leader and Premier at a convention in Whitehorse.
June 12, 2011, Darrell Pasloski is sworn in as Premier.
June 29, 2011, Brad Cathers rejoins the Yukon Party.
July 6, 2011, Steve Cardiff MLA for Mount Lorne dies in a car accident.
August 2011, Kristina Calhoun is appointed leader of the Yukon Green Party.
September 6, 2011, the Yukon First Nations Party is registered, Gerald Dickson is the leader.
September 9, 2011, issue of the writs.
September 19, 2011, 62 candidates are successfully nominated, none from the United Citizens Party, causing it to be deregistered.
October 2 & 3, 2011, advance polling.
October 5, 2011, CBC North hosts a leader's debate with Hanson, Mitchell, and Pasloski.
October 11, 2011, polling day.
October 17, 2011, return of the writs. Elections Yukon also announces the results of a recount in Copperbelt South, confirming Lois Moorcroft's three-vote margin of victory over Valerie Boxall.

Retiring MLAs

Opinion polls

Notes

References

External links
Elections Yukon

Elections in Yukon
2011 elections in Canada
2011 in Yukon
October 2011 events in Canada